Marcello Angelo Stroem (born 21 March 1987), also known as Markki Stroem, is a Filipino-Norwegian finalist on ABS-CBN's Pilipinas Got Talent Season 1.

He finished his studies with merit and honors in the Glion Institute of Higher Education in Switzerland with a Bachelor of Arts degree in hospitality and marketing management.

He is considered a Contemporary Crooner.

Career
Currently, a host for the Radio Talk Show, "The Morning Rush" on Monster RX93.1. He also hosts a fitness show called, "Fitness Tips for Lazy Peeps" on CSTV every Tuesday at 7pm.

Theater credits include, Henry in Next To Normal (Atlantis, 2011), Shane Gray in Camp Rock (Repertory, 2012), Tommy Ross in Carrie: The Musical (Atlantis, 2013), Leading Man in Kung Paano Ako Naging Leading Lady (Dalanghita prod, 2015), Tommy de Vito in Jersey Boys (Atlantis, 2016), Gabby in Awitin Mo at Isasayaw ko (Ballet Philippines, 2016), Claude Hooper Bukowski in Hair (Repertory, 2017), Terry Connor in Side Show (Atlantis, 2018) and Joe Pitt in Angels in America (Atlantis, 2019)

He also became part of ASAP (variety show) Boys R Boys (BRB) and won as Most Promising Male Group in the Guillermo Mendoza Box Office Awards. Other TV credits include Wako Wako (Abs-cbn, 2012), Dyesebel (Abs-cbn, 2015) and also played the role of Frank in Doble Kara (Abs-cbn, 2016). He is currently starring in an online TV series on LGBT streaming platform GagaOOLala called Unlocked.

He was nominated as Best Actor (Cinema 1 Originals Awards), Best Breakthrough Performance by an Actor (Golden Screen Awards), Best Breakthrough Actor (Gawad Tangi) and New Movie Actor of the Year (PMPC Star Awards for Movies) for Cinema One Originals 2012 Slumber Party. "10,000 hours," his 2013 Metro Manila Film Festival entry, garnered 14 awards at the "MMFF" movie awards. Including best movie for the 39th annual Metro Manila Film Festival. Nominated for a Gawad Buhay award for his performance as Claude Hooper Bukowski in Hair. (Repertory, 2017)

Singer, songwriter, arranger, music video director/producer. He produced and directed the following music videos: Rachelle Ann Go's “Whispered Fear”, Christian Bautista and Neocolours’ “Sasabihin” and Noel Cabangon's “Tuwing Umuulan at Kapiling Ka’
Director and Co-producer of his own singles “Steal Your Soul” and “Thousands of Pieces” which both gained outstanding response on the MYX charts.

He released his very first solo album "Thousands of Pieces" under Cornerstone Music, which topped the Astroplus top-selling album charts for September 2012.

Filmography

Theater

Film

Television

Discography
Pilipinas You Got It, Star Records 2011
Thousands of Pieces, Cornerstone Music 2012

External links
Markki Stroem's talent management website

References

1987 births
Living people
21st-century Filipino male singers
Filipino male models
People from Quezon City
Male actors from Metro Manila
Star Magic
Pilipinas Got Talent contestants
Filipino male musical theatre actors
Filipino people of Norwegian descent
Filipino LGBT singers
21st-century LGBT people